The 2020 Atlanta United FC season was the fourth season of Atlanta United FC's existence, and the twelfth year that a professional soccer club from Atlanta, Georgia competed in the top division of American soccer. Atlanta United played their home games at Mercedes-Benz Stadium. Outside of MLS, the team made their second appearance in the CONCACAF Champions League, and were set to participate in the 2020 U.S. Open Cup as defending champions, before the tournament's cancelation due to the COVID-19 pandemic.

Following the club's elimination from the MLS is Back Tournament, manager Frank de Boer was fired, with Atlanta United 2 manager Stephen Glass taking over as interim manager for the remainder of the season. The 2020 season was the first time Atlanta United FC finished worse than fourth in the Supporters' Shield table and failed to qualify for the MLS Cup playoffs.

Club

International roster slots 
Atlanta had eight International Roster Slots for use in the 2020 season. During the 2020 offseason, Franco Escobar, Ezequiel Barco, and Eric Remedi acquired green cards, making them domestic players for MLS roster purposes.

Results

Non-competitive

Friendlies

Competitive

Major League Soccer 

On March 12, 2020, the season entered a month-long suspension due to the COVID-19 pandemic in North America, following the cancellation of several matches. On March 19, the suspension was extended until May 10, and on April 17, the suspension was extended further to June 8. The COVID-19 pandemic caused the first interruption of regular season play since the 2001 MLS season, in which many late regular season games were cancelled due to the September 11 attacks.

On June 10, MLS announced that a bracket format dubbed the "MLS is Back Tournament" would begin July 8 at ESPN Wide World of Sports Complex in Walt Disney World, and end with the final on August 11. The three group stage matches would count towards the regular season standings. Following the tournament, the MLS regular season resumed with a revised schedule, concluding with the playoffs and MLS Cup 2020.

League tables

Eastern Conference

Overall

MLS is Back Tournament - Group E

Results summary 

*Table does not include three group stage matches of MLS is Back Tournament*

Results by round

Matches

MLS Cup Playoffs

U.S. Open Cup 

Originally, Atlanta United FC were to begin play by the 19th or the 20th of May. However, the tournament was suspended and eventually cancelled due to the COVID-19 pandemic.

CONCACAF Champions League

Round of 16

Quarter-finals

Statistics

Appearances and goals

|-
! colspan=16 style=background:#dcdcdc; text-align:center|Goalkeepers

|-
! colspan=16 style=background:#dcdcdc; text-align:center|Defenders

|-
! colspan=16 style=background:#dcdcdc; text-align:center|Midfielders

|-
! colspan=16 style=background:#dcdcdc; text-align:center|Forwards

|-
! colspan=16 style=background:#dcdcdc; text-align:center|Players who have played for Atlanta United this season but have left the club:

|}

Top scorers

Player movement

In

SuperDraft picks 
Draft picks are not automatically signed to the team roster. Only trades involving draft picks and executed after the start of 2020 MLS SuperDraft are listed in the notes. Atlanta had two selections in the draft.

Loan in

Out

Loan out

Non-player transfers

Honors

Weekly / monthly

MLS team / player / coach of the week

MLS goal of the week

References

Atlanta United FC seasons
Atlanta United
Atlanta United
Atlanta United FC
Atlanta